Weiting West railway station is a reserved railway station of Shanghai–Nanjing Intercity Railway located in Weiting Town, Suzhou, Jiangsu, China.

References

Railway stations in Suzhou